João Tamagnini de Sousa Barbosa (30 December 1883 – 15 December 1948), commonly known as João Tamagnini Barbosa, or Tamagnini Barbosa, was a Portuguese military officer and politician of the Portuguese First Republic (1910–1926). He served as Minister of Interior, Colonies and Finances during the period known as "New Republic", after the coup d'état of the National Republican Party ("Sidonist Party") and the semi-dictatorial government of President/Prime Minister Sidónio Pais, followed by a brief participation in the provisional government of João do Canto e Castro after the assassination of Sidónio Pais.

He briefly served as prime minister, after João do Canto e Castro, from 23 December 1918 to 27 January 1919.

After the 28 May 1926 revolution that installed the Ditadura Nacional (National Dictatorship) regime that would be followed by António de Oliveira Salazar's Estado Novo (New State), he was elected President of the General Assembly of S.L. Benfica on 19 January 1946. Morever, he served as the 18th president of Benfica from 25 January 1947 to 15 December 1948.

References

1883 births
1948 deaths
Prime Ministers of Portugal
Portuguese people of Italian descent
Government ministers of Portugal
Finance ministers of Portugal
S.L. Benfica presidents
20th-century Macau people